Messaging Security is a program that provides protection for companies' messaging infrastructure. The programs includes IP reputation-based anti-spam, pattern-based anti-spam, administrator defined block/allow lists, mail antivirus, zero-hour malware detection and email intrusion prevention.

Six Dimensions of Comprehensive Messaging Security

IP-Reputation Anti-spam It checks each email connection request with a database of IP addresses  to establish whether a sender is legitimate or known spam sender and malware.  If a sender is recognize it undesirable the messaging Security program drops the connection before the message is accepted.
Pattern-based anti-spam utilizes a proprietary algorithm to establish a fingerprint-like signature of email messages. When a message comes in, its pattern is calculated and checked against a database to determine if the message matches a known email pattern. This approach provides content agnostic protection and blocks spam without looking at any of the actual message content.
 Block/Allow List Anti-spam Administrators can create a list of IP addresses
or domains that they would like to either block or allow. This method ensures that trusted sources are explicitly allowed and unwanted sources are explicitly denied access.
 Mail Antivirus  This layer of protection blocks a wide range of known virus and malware attacks.
 Zero-Hour Malware Protection By analyzing large numbers of messages, outbreaks are detected along with their corresponding messages. These message patterns are then flagged as malicious, giving information about a given attack. With this information, outbreaks are blocked before a signature may be available, protecting the network in the critical period of attack development.
SmartDefense Email IPS The messaging security program utilizes SmartDefense Email IPS to stop attacks targeting the messaging infrastructure. Such attacks aim to gain access to the protected network, bring down a piece of the messaging infrastructure, or utilize the messaging infrastructure as a resource for launching new attacks.

Characteristics of Messaging Security 

 Protection against advanced spam such as image-based and multi-language spam.
 Antivirus protection through the combination of both zero-hour and signature-based detection.
 UTM solution for Messaging Security that is content and Language-independent.
 Advanced, real-time IP-reputation service.
 On-session email blocking (emails are checked and blocked during the original SMTP/POP3 session).

See also 
 
 Firewall
 Unified threat management 
 Virtual firewall 
 Circuit-level gateway
 Sandbox (computer security)
 Screened-subnet firewall

References 

Computer network security